KJEE (92.9 FM) is a commercial radio station that is licensed to Montecito, California and broadcasts to the Santa Barbara and  areas. The station is owned by James Evans under the name of licensee Montecito FM, Inc. and airs a modern rock format.

History
KJEE signed on in March 1994 with a modern rock format. Initially, owner James Evans stunted with a variety of formats by playing a different artist each day, eventually choosing to satisfy the unmet demand for alternative rock in the Santa Barbara radio market. During its first few months in operation, KJEE aired with few commercials and did no formal marketing, instead building its audience by appearing at selected local events and through word of mouth. In the Spring 1994 Arbitron ratings report, the first one in which the station appears, KJEE earned a share of 5.6 in the 12+ group in the market and ranked number one among adults 18–34.

Evans hired only three employees to launch KJEE. Original general manager Eddie Gutierrez sold advertising and planned promotions. Programming director/marketing director Heather Luke made all on-air announcements; assistant PD/assistant MD Deanne Saffran reported on local traffic, answered the station's phones, and voiced commercials. All four staff members also worked regular on-air shifts, pre-recording their material at first. Luke departed in June 1995, and Gutierrez and Saffran assumed her PD and MD duties, respectively. In September 1995, KHTY morning personality Ricky Suave joined KJEE as its new APD, hosting the same time slot.

Concerts
Since 2004, KJEE has sponsored an annual series of concerts in the Santa Barbara and Ventura areas featuring alternative rock artists, some of whom originate from the station's listening area.

Bands listed in reverse order of night's performance. Headlining act in bold.

References

External links

JEE
Modern rock radio stations in the United States
Montecito, California
Radio stations established in 1994
1994 establishments in California